"Cadaeic Cadenza" is a 1996 short story by Mike Keith. It is an example of  constrained writing, a story with restrictions on how it can be written.  It is also one of the most prodigious examples of piphilology, being written in "pilish". The word "cadaeic" is the alphabetical equivalent of 3.141593, the first six decimal digits of pi when rounded, where each digit is replaced by the Nth letter of the alphabet; a cadenza is a solo passage in music.

In addition to the main restriction, the author attempts to mimic portions, or entire works, of different types and pieces of literature ("The Raven", "Jabberwocky", the lyrics of Yes, "The Love Song of J. Alfred Prufrock", Rubaiyat, Hamlet, and Carl Sandburg's Grass) in story, structure, and rhyme.

The limitations
When the number of letters in each word is written out they form the first 3835 digits of pi.
{|style="border: none; text-align: center;"
|-
|One||/||A||Poem||/||A||Raven||/||Midnights||so||dreary,||tired||and||weary,
|-
|3  ||.||1||4   || ||1||5    || ||9        ||2 ||6      ||5    ||3  ||5
|}
While in this example each word is the same number of letters as the next digit of pi (and ten letters for the digit 0), some sections use words of more than ten letters as a one followed by another digit:
{|style="border: none; text-align: center;"
|-
|And||fear||overcame||my||being||–||the||fear||of||"forevermore".
|-
|3  ||4   ||8       ||2 ||5    || ||3  ||4   ||2 ||11
|}
where 11 represents two consecutive digit "1"s in pi.

Taking "A" as 1, "B" as 2, "C" as 3, etc., the name of the piece itself is based on pi, as "Cadaeic" is the first 7 digits of pi, when rounded to that number of significant digits.
 C a d a e i c
 3.1 4 1 5 9 3

Near a Raven 
The first part of Cadaeic Cadenza is slightly changed from an earlier version, "Near a Raven", which was a retelling of Edgar Allan Poe's "The Raven".

See also
Six nines in pi (handled at the start of chapter 2, "Change")

References

External links
Cadaeic Cadenza

Mnemonics
Pi
Constrained writing